The Charleston-class amphibious cargo ships were a class of amphibious cargo ships in service with the United States Navy. These ships served in Amphibious Readiness Groups between 1968 and 1994. The ships were the last amphibious cargo ships built for the U.S. Navy, their role having been taken over by the San Antonio-class of amphibious transport dock.

Service
Built in the late 1960s, these ships participated in the Vietnam War. Four of the five ships in the class had been transferred to the reserve fleet in the late 1970s and early 1980s. The need for additional sealift capacity resulted in all four being returned to the active fleet in 1982. They are among the first Navy ships to have a fully automated main propulsion plant (600-pound pressure with superheat, known as a "Super Six."). The remaining ships were decommissioned in 1994. All ships were mothballed for possible activation in the future.

Design

The assigned mission of the amphibious cargo ship was to transport and land combat equipment and material with attendant personnel in an amphibious assault. To optimize their capability for combat loading, they provided considerable flexibility in cargo stowage methods. The cargo elevators servicing holds 1, 3, and 4 make all categories of supplies and all levels available simultaneously to either the main deck or the helicopter platform. Use of the ship's forklifts and pallet transporters speed the maneuvering of cargo in the holds and enable delivery to various debarkation stations via the main deck passageways, which run the length of the ship. The arrangement and quantity of booms and cargo elevators make it possible to simultaneously embark/debark vehicles and cargo.

Vehicles in upper stowage spaces can be embarked/debarked through the hatches with cargo booms, while pallets are embarked/debarked in lower stowage spaces by elevators. The main deck hatch of hold 2 is unobstructed and can be opened for embarking/debarking of vehicles without the delay of unloading landing craft stowed on the hatch. Hold 4 is well suited for high priority cargo because of its direct access to the flight deck or main deck via elevator number 5.

Ships

References

See also
 
 
 
 
 List of United States Navy amphibious warfare ships